Khomartaj (also Romanized as Khomārtāj; also known as Khomārtāsh) is a village in Harasam Rural District, Homeyl District, Eslamabad-e Gharb County, Kermanshah Province, Iran. At the 2006 census, its population was 284, in 65 families.

References 

( the lasso )

Populated places in Eslamabad-e Gharb County